Kentiopsis oliviformis is a species of flowering plant in the family Arecaceae. It is found only in New Caledonia.

References

oliviformis
Endemic flora of New Caledonia
Trees of New Caledonia
Endangered plants
Taxonomy articles created by Polbot